Viverravidae ("ancestors of viverrids") is an extinct monophyletic family of mammals from extinct superfamily Viverravoidea within the clade Carnivoramorpha, that lived from the early Palaeocene to the late Eocene in North America, Europe and Asia. They were once thought to be the earliest carnivorans and ancestral to extant ones, but now are placed outside the order Carnivora based on cranial morphology as relatives (a plesion-group) to extant carnivorans.

General characteristics
Wang and Tedford propose that they arose in North America 66-60 million years ago, spread to Asia then later to Europe, and were the first carnivoramorphans and possessed the first true pair of carnassial teeth. In viverravids, the skull is elongated and the number of molars is reduced to two (M1/m1 and M2/m2 are present and M3/m3 are absent).

Classification and phylogeny

Classification
Taxonomy retrieved from the Paleobiology Database

|}

Phylogeny
The phylogenetic relationships of family Viverravidae are shown in the following cladogram:

See also
 Mammal classification
 Carnivoramorpha
 Miacoidea

References

 
Paleocene first appearances
Eocene extinctions
Prehistoric mammal families